There are 16 counties and 1 independent city in the U.S. state of Nevada. On November 25, 1861, the first Nevada Territorial Legislature established 9 counties. Nevada was admitted to the Union on October 31, 1864, with 11 counties. In 1969, Ormsby County and Carson City were consolidated into a single municipal government known as Carson City.

The FIPS county code is the five-digit Federal Information Processing Standard (FIPS) code which uniquely identifies counties and county equivalents in the United States. The three-digit number is unique to each individual county within a state, but to be unique within the entire United States, it must be prefixed by the state code. This means that, for example, while Churchill County, Nevada is 001, Alameda County, California and Baker County, Oregon are also 001. To uniquely identify Churchill County, Nevada, one must use the state code of 32 plus the county code of 001; therefore, the unique nationwide identifier for Churchill County, Nevada is 32001. The links in the column FIPS County Code are to the Census Bureau Info page for that county.

Counties

|}

Defunct counties
 Bullfrog County, Nevada, formed in 1987 from part of Nye county. Creation was declared unconstitutional and abolished in 1989.
 Lake County, Nevada, one of the original nine counties formed in 1861. Renamed Roop County in 1862. Part became Lassen County, California in 1864. Nevada remainder annexed in 1883 to Washoe county.
 Ormsby County, Nevada, one of the original nine counties formed in 1861. Consolidated in 1969 with the county seat, Carson City, forming the independent city of that name.

References

Nevada
 
Counties